This is an alphabetical list of BASIC dialects — interpreted and compiled variants of the BASIC programming language. Each dialect's platform(s), i.e., the computer models and operating systems, are given in parentheses along with any other significant information.

Dialects

0–9
 1771-DB BASIC 
 Allen-Bradley PLC industrial controller BASIC module; Intel BASIC-52 extended with PLC-specific calls.
 64K BASIC
 Cross-platform, interactive, open-source interpreter for microcomputer BASIC.

A
 ABasiC (Amiga)
 Relatively limited. Initially provided with Amiga computers by MetaComCo.
 ABC BASIC
 designed for the ABC 80 and ABC 800 line of computers designed by Dataindustrier AB and manufactured by Luxor AB (including ABC 802, ABC 806 etc.).
 ACE (Amiga)
 A Compiler for Everyone — Freeware, AmigaBASIC compatible, has extra features, some of which exploit the Amiga's hardware and operating system.
Advan BASIC
 For the Atari home computer, disk based, containing BASIC, compiler, screen design and utilities. Released to public domain July, 2006
Advanced BASIC
 (a.k.a. BASIC Advanced, Advanced BASIC) (DOS on the PC) by Microsoft. Available in ROM on IBM PCs. Later disk based versions for IBM PC DOS.
 AlphaBasic

 Altair BASIC
 (a.k.a. MITS 4K BASIC, MITS 8K BASIC, Altair Disk Extended BASIC) (Altair 8800, S-100) — Microsoft's first product
 Altair Disk Extended BASIC
 See Altair BASIC
 Amiga BASIC (Amiga)
 Somewhat easier than ABasiC, see MS BASIC for Macintosh.
 AmiBlitz (Amiga)
 Open-source version of Blitz BASIC.
 AMOS BASIC (Amiga)
 For the Amiga, made for game programming. A descendant of STOS BASIC on the Atari ST. Later derivatives included AMOS Professional (a.k.a. AMOS Pro) and Easy AMOS.
 AOZ Studio (PC, Mac, Smartphones,...) A new version on steroid for modern machines generating JS/Html. Now in final beta after 2.5 years of R&D.

 ANSI
 Standard for the programming language Minimal BASIC X3.60-1978, a 1978 standard for minimal features, and X3.113-1987, the full BASIC standard; rarely implemented fully.
 Apple BASIC (Apple I)
 See: Integer BASIC
 Apple Business BASIC (Apple III)

 Applesoft BASIC (Apple II series)
 Based on the same Microsoft code that Commodore BASIC was based on. Standard on the Apple II Plus/Apple II Europlus and all later models of the Apple II family.
 ARMbasic
 BASIC compiler for ARM processors, ported to a number of popular ARM development PCBs.
 APU BASIC
 version of SORD CBASIC for the M23 with arithmetic processor
 Aribas
 interactive interpreter for big integer arithmetic and multi-precision floating point arithmetic with a Pascal/Modula-like syntax. It has several builtin functions for algorithmic number theory like gcd, Jacobi symbol, Rabin probabilistic prime test, factorization algorithms (Pollard rho, elliptic curve, continued fraction, quadratic sieve), etc.
 ASIC
 (DOS on the PC)
 Assembler 
PICAXE chip language
Atari 2600 Basic Programming
 (Atari 2600 video game console)
 SuperCharger Disk BASIC (Atari 2600 video game console)
 StarPath SuperCharger cartridge plus disk-based extensions.
Atari BASIC (Atari 8-bit family)
 The standard cartridge-based interpreter for the Atari 400/800 personal computers and successors. On later machines, such as the Atari 800XL, this was built into the ROM.
 Atari Microsoft BASIC (Atari 8-bit family)
 ROM cartridge plus disk-based extensions.
 AT&T
 interpreter and compiler for the AT&T UNIX PC (3B1).
 AttoBasic
 ROM-resident interpreter, executes from on-chip RAM (Atmel AVR)
 Atom BASIC (Acorn Atom)

 AutoIt (Microsoft Windows)
 automates other programs, e.g. with simulated mouse clicks. Interpreted. GUI. Creates EXEs.

B
 B32 Business Basic
 (Data General Eclipse MV, Unix, DOS)
 BaCon
 (Unix, BSD, Mac OS X) — Basic to C converter implemented both in BaCon(for good performance) and shell script(for bootstrapping).
 BAIT
 short for BASIC (Almost) InTerpreter was an experimental BASIC interpreter written in Atari (8-bit) BASIC for Compute! Magazine by Bill Wilkinson.
 Bas
 (Unix) — Interpreter for the classic BASIC dialect
 Bas7
 (Unix, Linux, BSD, Microsoft Windows, Mac OS X) A BASIC interpreter, written in Seed7, which is compatible to GW-BASIC and other old BASIC dialects
 Banna Basic
 (Microsoft Windows) — putatively under development by Leodescal Softwares; the first officially launched version is supposed to produce stand-alone executables
 BASCOM
 Compilers for the 8051 and AVR chips
 Basic+
 programming language for OpenInsight
 BASIC 2.0
 (see Commodore BASIC)
 BASIC 7.0
 (see Commodore BASIC)
 BASIC A+
 (Atari 8-bit family) — An extended BASIC for the Atari 8-bit family, by Optimized Systems Software
 BASIC Advanced
 See IBM BASICA
 BASIC Programming
 (Atari CX-2620) was a simple attempt of the BASIC language for the Atari 2600 Video Computer System
 BASIC XE
 (Atari 8-bit family) — An enhanced version of BASIC XL, by Optimized Systems Software
 BASIC XL
 (Atari 8-bit family) — Improved BASIC for the Atari 8-bit family, by Optimized Systems Software
 Basic4GL
 Fast interpreter meant for OpenGL graphical programming, especially games
 BASIC-11
 (DEC PDP-11, RSX-11)
 Basic-256
 (Microsoft Windows, Linux, Unix) — BASIC IDE with text and graphics output, written to introduce children to programming. Originally known as KidBASIC.
 BASIC-52
 BASIC for the Intel 8052 microcontroller chip
 BASIC-68K
 structured BASIC for the SORD M68/M68MX computers running in CP/M-68K mode
 BASIC-E
 (a.k.a. submarine BASIC) (CP/M)
 BASIC-II
 structured BASIC for 8-bit SORD computers
 BASIC Plus 2
 (DEC PDP-11: RSTS/E, RSX-11)
 BASIC-PLUS
 (DEC PDP-11: RSTS/E) 
 BASIC/UX
 HP BASIC for HP-UX, version of Rocky Mountain BASIC
 BASIC/WS
 HP BASIC Workstation
 BASIC/Z
 (CP/M, MDOS)
 BASIC09
 (OS-9 and OS-9 68K on Motorola 6809 and 68K CPUs, respectively)
 BASICA
 (a.k.a. BASIC Advanced, Advanced BASIC) (DOS on the PC) by Microsoft. Available in ROM on IBM PCs. Later disk based versions for IBM PC DOS.
 BASICODE
 (Many 8-bit home computers, including KC 85) A subset common to many platform-specific BASICs, enabling interoperability. 
 Basic For Qt
 (Mac OS X, Linux and Windows) — Platform independent BASIC. Object-oriented Visual Basic-like Basic variant. Based on Qt. (previously, KBASIC)
 BasiEgaXorz
 (Sega Genesis) — for the Sega Genesis
 batari BASIC
 version primarily used for homebrew Atari 2600 development.
 BBC BASIC
 Originally for the Acorn/BBC Micro, but has since been ported to RISC OS, Tiki 100, Cambridge Z88, Amstrad NC100, CP/M, ZX Spectrum, DOS, Microsoft Windows and many others. A GPL clone of BBC BASIC named Brandy written in portable C is also available (RISC OS, NetBSD, OpenBSD, FreeBSD, Linux, Mac OS X, AmigaOS, DOS). Also a port made for the Commodore 64 by Aztec Software, written by Julian Gardner.
 Bazic '86
 See Northstar BASIC
 BBx
 (Microsoft Windows, Linux, Unix) — Cross-platform program development language derived from Business Basic.
 BCX
 small command line tool that inputs a BCX BASIC source code file and outputs a 'C' source code file which can be compiled with many C or C++ compilers.
 BEOWULF
 {Beginner Extended Object with Ultra Language Functionality}
 Beta BASIC
 BASIC toolkit that extended Sinclair BASIC.
 BetterBASIC
 BASIC implementation by Summit Software Technologies, first available in the early 1980s. It was later maintained by Michael Poremski.
 BI-280
 Business BASIC interpreter (CP/M, MP/M) by Control C Corporation, Beaverton, Oregon.
 Blitz3D
 (Microsoft Windows) Fast compiler made for 3D game programming, with DirectX 7 support.
 Blitz BASIC
 (Amiga, Windows) — Fast compiler meant for game programming. Windows version with DirectX support. Discontinued, replaced by BlitzPlus.
 BlitzMax
 (macOS, Linux, Windows) — Fast and compact object-oriented compiler meant for several tasks, most notably Game programming with OpenGL and DirectX support (DirectX support is Windows only).
 BlitzPlus
 (Microsoft Windows) Fast compiler made for 2D game programming and WinAPI event based interpreted programming. Supports both DirectX and OpenGL.
 Blunt Axe Basic
 (a.k.a. BXBASM) (Win32, Linux) Bxbasic is presented as a programming tutorial, to develop and construct a Console Mode Scripting Engine and Byte Code Compiler.
BS Basic
Used on the Bandai RX-78 computer
 Bsisith
 Hebrew dialect.
 BT-Basic
 Board Test Basic, used by HP (later Agilent, then Keysight) to develop and run test programs in an in-circuit test environment
 BURP
 Basic Using Reverse Polish, used by the very early PSI Comp 80 "scientific computer", as published in the British radio enthusiasts magazine Wireless World
 Business Basic
 name given collectively to BASIC variants which were specialized for business use on minicomputers in the 1970s.
 bwBASIC
 See Bywater BASIC
 BWBASIC
 "ByteWide BASIC", a stand-alone Z-80 bitwise port of Tiny BASIC - co developed by Pro-Log Corporation and ByteWide Systems, Australia. Intended for control applications.
 BXBASM
 See Blunt_Ane_Basic
 Bywater BASIC
 (a.k.a. bwBASIC) — an open source interpreter for DOS and POSIX. Bwbasic contains only a small portion of the ANSI BASIC commands. Its main advantage is that one can also use shell commands in programs, an unusual feature in any BASIC implementation. It could theoretically be used as the main shell on a DOS or POSIX system, with some advantages.

C
 CA-Realizer
 dialect similar to VisualBasic by Computer Associates, last version 3.0, no longer under development/supported
 Caché Basic
 One of the two scripting languages in the Caché Database
 CARDBASIC
 version of BASIC operated by cards available in Dartmouth when that language was created and described in the original manual
 Casio BASIC
 used in Casio calculators
 Cassette BASIC
 An interpreter on IBM and IBM compatible PCs to which the machine will default if no operating system is detected.
 CBASIC (CP/M, DOS)
 BASIC-E successor.
 CBASIC
 standard interpreter for 8-bit SORD computers (M23, M68 in Z80 mode, etc.), a.k.a. APU BASIC when the arithmetic processor is installed
 cbasPad Pro
 See HotPaw Basic
 CBM BASIC
 See Commodore BASIC
 CellularBASIC
 Java ME open source on-phone mobile interpreter for Java-enabled handheld devices, mobiles, smartphones, and PDAs
 Chinese BASIC
 Several Chinese-translated BASIC languages developed in the early 1980s.
 Chipmunk Basic
 (Apple Macintosh, CLI ports for Win32, Linux) — copyrighted freeware
 CGIbasic
 small and fast interpreter for web-scripting.
 CipherLab Basic
 tool to develop application programs for CipherLab 8 Series Mobile Computers using BASIC programming language
 CocoaBasic
 (Mac OS X) — Object-oriented dialect for using the Cocoa Framework
 CognosScript
 (IBM Corporation Cognos) Similar to Visual Basic, used in Cognos business intelligence applications.
 Color BASIC
 (Tandy / RadioShack TRS-80 Color Computer)
 Commodore BASIC
 (a.k.a. CBM BASIC) (Various computers in CBM's line of 8-bit computers) — Was integrated in the ROM of CBM's 8-bit computers. Built on an early version of 6502 Microsoft BASIC. There were several versions — the best-known was Commodore Basic V2, as used in the Commodore 64.
 Compaq BASIC for OpenVMS
 DEC BASIC, renamed after DEC was acquired by Compaq. Now called VSI BASIC for OpenVMS.
 CoolBasic
 (Windows) — A variant suited for game programming with DirectX. :fi:Coolbasic
 CPX-Basic
 (Atari ST) — An enhanced port of Chipmunk Basic running as a control panel inside Atari's XControl.
 Creative Basic
 (Windows)
 Cubloc Basic
 (Comfile Technologies) — Interpreter for the Cubloc controller
 (Cybiko)
 Interpreter for the Cybiko Handheld Computer for Teens
 Cybiko B2C
 (Cybiko) — A BASIC to C compiler for the Cybiko Handheld Computer for Teens
 Cypress BASIC
 (Windows) — a royalty-free VBA compatible scripting engine embedded, e.g., within HP's AssetCenter product for implementing customizations

D
 D3/Pick
 See: Pick/BASIC for use on the Pick Operating System
 DAI BASIC
 a very early BASIC interpreter for the Intel 8080 based DAI Personal Computer that used java-like pre-compilation.
 DarkBASIC & DarkBASIC Professional
 (Windows) — Efficient compiler for game programming.
 Dartmouth BASIC
 the original BASIC version. It was a compiler. Later versions included MAT statements for matrix operations. See also True BASIC.
 Data General Business Basic
 (Data General Nova and later DG minicomputers)
 Data/BASIC
 See: Pick/BASIC for use on the Pick Operating System
 Databasic
 See: Pick/BASIC for use on the Pick Operating System
 DBASIC
 fast nonstandard BASIC for the Atari ST written entirely in machine language
 DEC BASIC
 Formerly VAX BASIC; renamed after VAX/VMS was ported to Alpha processors and renamed OpenVMS. Now called VSI BASIC for OpenVMS due to corporate acquisitions.
 Decimal BASIC
 Japanese multi-platform Basic interpreter compatible almost 100% with ISO/IEC 10279:Full BASIC 1991 or later
 Dr. T's T-BASIC
 (Atari ST) — A BASIC variant for the ST designed specifically to interface with a high-end MIDI sequencer. 
 DragonBASIC
 for GBA handheld video game; also useful for Nintendo DS homebrew. Dragon Basic is a sort of cross-compiler with IDE that runs on Microsoft Windows.
 D-Lib
 for (Microsoft Windows) is a Freeware BASIC compiler that creates bytecode executables.

E
 Easy AMOS
 See AMOS BASIC
 Emergence Basic
 (Windows)
 Envelop Basic
 (Windows) — Visual Basic 3 clone.
 Envision Basic
 Epson SPEL+
 (Windows) — SPEL+  is  a  BASIC-like  programming  language  that  runs  in  the Epson robot controllers. It  supports multitasking, motion control, and I/O control. 
 ESP8266 BASIC
 (ESP8266 and NodeMCU) - An open-source basic interpreter specifically tailored for the internet of things. Self-hosting browser-based development environment.
 ethosBASIC
 (Windows) — ethosBASIC is a new BASIC development system made to create computer games.
 Extended Color BASIC
 (TRS-80 Color Computer and Dragon 32/64)

F
 FaST Basic
 (Atari ST)
 Famicom BASIC
 (Nintendo Entertainment System) — For the Nintendo Entertainment System.
 FBSL
 (Windows, Linux on WinE) — FREESTYLE Basic Script Language
 FirST Basic
 (Atari ST)
 FreeBASIC
 (DOS (DPMI32), MS Windows and Linux) — An open source (GPL) BASIC compiler, that employs a similar syntax to QuickBASIC's, with more advanced features like pointers and object-oriented programming, it also supports a dialect specially designed to be compatible with QuickBASIC.
 FutureBASIC
 (Mac OS) — Free compiled, procedural, provides access to Carbon API (Mac OS Toolbox), GUI and file system of System 6 to Mac OS X
 FUZE BASIC
 (MS Windows and Linux) — Highly modernized adaptation of classic BASIC.

G
 Galaksija BASIC
 (Galaksija) — Firmware version for Galaksija home computer.
 Gambas
 (Linux / Unix / Cygwin) — A rapid application development environment for BASIC on Linux by Benoît Minisini. Similar approach as Visual Basic.
 GamesBasic
 Free object-oriented BASIC variant meant for game programming.
 GBasic
 (DOS on the PC) — Interpreter with many graphics routines.
 GBasic
 ( on the ZVT PP 01) — Interpreter with many graphics routines, Made in Czechoslovakia 80's
 G-BASIC
 version of SORD CBASIC with SORD Graphic Language extensions for the M23 with graphics board
 GeoBASIC
 (Leica TPS 1000/1100 surveying stations)
 geoBASIC
 (Commodore 64) — For use with GEOS
 GFA BASIC
 (Atari ST, Amiga, DOS, Windows) — Originally conceived on the Atari ST where it became one of the most popular BASICs for that platform (it almost became a standard language for the Atari ST). Was later ported to the Amiga, DOS and Windows.
 GLBasic
 (main target platforms: Windows, Linux, Apple iPhone, Pocket PC. IDE environment: Windows) — optimized for games
 Gnome Basic
 (Linux/Unix) — project to develop a Visual Basic compatible clone for Gnome. During development, the project was discontinued.
 Graphics BASIC
 (Commodore 64) — extension to the original Commodore 64 BASIC V2.
 Great Cow BASIC
 (Microchip PIC , AVR & LGT (Logic Green Technologies)) — Open source compiler for 8-bit architecture PIC, AVR and LGT microcontrollers.
 GW-BASIC
 (DOS and Windows) by Microsoft. BASICA compatible; independent of IBM ROM routines. Came with versions of MS-DOS before 5.0. Included music macro language and advanced loops.

H
 HBasic
 (Linux / Unix) — Object-oriented open source IDE. HBasic based on Qt IDE and a BASIC dialect. Similar approach as Visual Basic.
 HiSoft Basic
 (Amiga, Atari ST, ZX Spectrum)
 High Tech BASIC
 Version of Rocky Mountain BASIC by TransEra
 HotBasic
 (Win32, Linux) — Simple but powerful compiler, emits machine code. Supports GUI, console, CGI, and database programming.
 HotPaw Basic
 (a.k.a. yBasic, née cbasPad Pro) (Palm OS) — Interpreter with GUI and sound functions.
 HP BASIC
 The original Version of Rocky Mountain BASIC
 HP Instrument BASIC
 Another name for HP Rocky Mountain BASIC
 HRAST-BASIC
 For HP-48G/G+/GX, HP-49G and HP-49G+/50G calculators.
 HP BASIC for OpenVMS
 Originally VAX BASIC; renamed to DEC BASIC after VAX/VMS was ported from VAX to Alpha processors; renamed to Compaq BASIC after Compaq acquired DEC; renamed to HP BASIC for OpenVMS name after HP acquired Compaq. Now known as VSI BASIC for OpenVMS.
 HP Basic
 version on the HP 39 and 40 programmable calculators.
 HP Time-Shared BASIC
 (HP 2100 line of minicomputers)
 HTBasic
 Version of Rocky Mountain BASIC by TransEra
 Hummingbird Basic
 The automation facility in Hummingbird Connectivity; it replaced WinWrap Basic after version 4
 HuBASIC
 For the Samsung SPC-1000, Sharp MZ-700 and Sharp X1, written in 1982 by Hudson Soft in Japan.

I
 IBasic
 (Windows) — With Windows API and DirectX support. 
 IBM Cassette BASIC
 (PC) — Built into the first IBM PCs. Ran independently of DOS and used audio cassettes as a storage medium.
 IBM VS-BASIC
 Mainframe hybrid compiler/interpreter implementation frequently used with such operating systems as McGill University's MUSIC/SP.
 ICPL
 (Computervision CADDS-2/VLSI) — Interpreter tied into an integrated circuit design database.
 INFOBASIC
 Used on Prime Computers, a variant of Pick BASIC for use on the Pick Operating System
Integer BASIC
 (Apple II series) — Steve Wozniak's own creation. Originally known simply as "Apple BASIC". For the BASICs available at the time, it was very fast and memory-efficient. Only supported integers. Came as standard on the Apple I and original Apple II
Initial Programming Language
 (Windows) Uses dialog boxes for every command and directs essential message queue messages to predefined functions discarding the rest. Tries to keep to the spirit of simple home computer BASICs rather than a fully featured language like Visual Basic.
 Internet Basic
 Written for use with the Comet system. Both were created by Signature Systems.
 IS-BASIC
 The interpreter of the Enterprise 64 and 128 home computers, written by Intelligent Software Ltd.
 IWBasic
 (Windows) A version of Basic that generates native machine code so no runtime libraries are needed.
 iziBasic
 (Palm OS) Easy-to-use compiler that runs on Palm OS devices and emits stand-alone programs. Includes terminal mode and support for Palm OS GUI.

J
 Jabaco
 simple object-oriented programming language to build applications/applets on the Java Framework.
 Just BASIC
 restricted "free" version of Liberty BASIC (Windows only)
 JBasic
 a "classic" implementation of BASIC written entirely in Java.
 JR-BASIC
 used on the Matsushita JR series home computers
 jvmBasic
 An implementation of BASIC which compiles to Java Bytecode

K
 Kool-Bee
 See KoolB
 KoolB
 (short for Kool-Bee) (Windows, Linux) — Open source compiler, minimal, made mainly for learning purposes.
 KBasic
 Basic for Qt

L
 Liberty BASIC
 (Windows, Mac, Linux) — Traditional structured BASIC with extensions for desktop GUI programming.
 LikeBASIC
 (Windows) — Basic interpreter component for applications in the .NET Framework environment
 Locomotive BASIC
 (Amstrad CPC, Amstrad NC100) — built into the ROM, (ZX Spectrum +3) on CP/M disk
 LotusScript
 (IBM Lotus Notes)
 LowRes Coder
 (iOS)—App to create retro-style games or demos in BASIC.
 Luxor Basic
 (Luxor ABC 80)
 Learn to Program BASIC
 (Windows 95–98, Macintosh 7.5–9) — youth-oriented version, with interactive lessons to teach the user how to program
 LxBasic
 (Linux) Freeware Free compiler and runtime compatible with Theos MultiUser Basic

M
 M2000 Interpreter
 dual vocabulary (Greek-English) Interpreter in own environment - Open Source- Written in Vb6. 
 MacBASIC
 Apple's original BASIC for the Macintosh, released as Beta software and discontinued due to a deal with Microsoft
 MAI Basic Four Business Basic
 (misc. minicomputers)
 Mallard BASIC
 (Amstrad PCW, ZX Spectrum +3 on CP/M) — Similar to Locomotive BASIC
 MapBasic
 procedural language used specifically for GIS programs.
 MasmBasic
 over 300 BASIC-style macros for the Microsoft Macro Assembler; requires the Masm32 package.
 MBASIC
 (CP/M) — Further development of OBASIC, also by Microsoft. MBasic was one of the BASICs developed by Microsoft. Came with a line editor.
 MELFA BASIC
 used by certain Mitsubishi robots and simulation packages.
 METRIC-BASIC
 also known as Uppsala-BASIC
 MelloCOMPLEX
 Based on "COMPLEX", a variant of BASIC
 MICOL BASIC
 Compiled Basic based upon elements of C for the Apple ][ gs platform
 Microsoft BASIC
 many versions for several different CPUs and system architectures exist, and many other BASICs are derivatives of some Microsoft BASIC
 Microsoft BASICA
 See BASICA
 Microsoft GW-BASIC
 GW-BASIC
 Microsoft Small Basic

 Microsoft Level III BASIC
 (Tandy / RadioShack TRS-80)
 Microsoft Visual Basic
 Visual Basic
 MinimalBASIC
 A compiler for ECMA-55 Minimal BASIC emitting GNU assembly language targeting 64-bit x86-64 Linux
 MITS 4K BASIC
 Altair BASIC
 MITS 8K BASIC
 Altair BASIC
 MMBasic
 The GWBasic Clone used by the Maximite Microcomputer
 Mobile BASIC
 (Java enabled mobile phones)
 MOLE Basic
 (DOS on the PC) — Merty's Own Language Extension BASIC
 Moonrock Basic Compiler
 (DOS on the PC) — Small compiler
 Monkey
 (Supports various platforms, see page for details) — A simple but powerful programming language built primarily for Game programming
 Morfik Basic
 Object-oriented dialect that can used to create Web applications, server and browser client-side code. (Web) MS BASIC for Macintosh
 (Mac OS) MSX BASIC
 (MSX) — by Microsoft
 MTBASIC
 (CP/M, DOS) Multitasking BASIC compiler by Softaid

N
 N82-BASIC
 (Old NEC PC8201/8201A) N88-BASIC
 (Old NEC PC8801/9801) — Japan's most popular BASIC based on Microsoft's one
 N.A.M.E. Basic
 compiles into bytecode to run on the Java Virtual Machine. Can also run in interpreted mode on the JVM
 Nevada BASIC
 Ellis Computing Eight-bit CP/M, had 12 digit precision and matrix operations. A port of Processor Technology 8 KB BASIC
 NorthStar BASIC
 (Processor Technology, NorthStar Horizon, later adapted to x86 as Bazic '86) and S.A.I.L.B.O.A.T. (a basic optimized for Z80 and X86 MS-DOS)
 NS Basic
 (Newton OS, Symbian OS, Palm OS, Windows CE, Windows Mobile, Microsoft Windows ) — IDE and Bytecode-interpreter
 nuBASIC
 (Linux, Microsoft Windows ) — Interpreter written in C++11 for educational purposes.

O
 Oasis Basic
 see THEOS Multi-User Basic
 OBASIC
 (CP/M) — by Microsoft
 Omikron Basic
 (Atari ST, Mac OS) — Originally developed by Omikron Software for Atari ST. In Germany it was bundled with new Atari STs for a long time. Was later ported to the classic Mac OS and was further developed for Mac OS X.
 OpenBASIC
 developed by MAI Systems Corporation, Inc.
 Open Programming Language OPL
 (Symbian OS phones and PDAs) — Originally developed for Psion's product line of organisers and PDAs. OPL used to stand for Organiser Programming Language but after becoming open source in 2003, it was renamed. Available for most of Psion's classic organisers and PDAs, Nokia 9210/9290/9300/9500 Communicators and Sony Ericsson P800/P900/P910.
 OWBasic
 (Pocketviewer (Casio pda)) — Fast compiler/interpreter system, Open Source

P
 Panoramic (computer language)
 For Windows, able to handle 3D world and many Windows objects.
 Parrot BASIC
 For the Parrot virtual machine; V 1.0 is modeled on GW-BASIC, V 2.0 is modeled on Microsoft QuickBASIC version 4.5
 PBASIC
 for use with the Parallax BASIC Stamp microcontroller
 PeayBASIC
 hand-written interpreter in C# for simple text and graphics output
 Phoenix Object Basic
 (Linux / Unix) — free, includes GUI builder
 PIC BASIC
 for use with microcontrollers
 PIC BASIC Pro
 aka PBP — for use with PIC microcontrollers
 PICAXE BASIC
 for use with PICAXE microcontrollers
 Pick/BASIC
 (a.k.a. Data/BASIC, Databasic) (Pick operating system) — a BASIC language, extended for business use, and embedded into the Pick environment and variations of it.
 PlayBASIC
 (Microsoft Windows) — Fast and feature rich, focused on 2D game development.
 PowerBASIC
 (DOS, Win16, Win32) — free and commercial compilers for DOS and Windows, which focus on fast compile speeds and small binaries. They are Turbo Basic successors.
 Processor Technology
 5 KB and 8 KB BASICs. Created for the SOL-20 computer, but widely ported to other platforms as Processor Technology published the 8080 source code. Nevada BASIC (CP/M) and Utah BASIC [MS-DOS] were the latest ports.
 Profan
 (Windows) — easy to use, interpreted
 Professional Development System (PDS)
 A superset of Microsoft QuickBASIC targeted at professional software developers.
 ProvideX
 (Microsoft Windows, Linux, Unix) — Cross-platform program development language derived from Business Basic
 PSX Chipmunk BASIC
 (PlayStation) — For the PlayStation
 PureBasic
 (Microsoft Windows (x86, x64), Linux (x86, x64), AmigaOS, macOS (x64, arm64 Apple silicon) and Raspberry Pi (arm32, arm64)) — Cross-platform program development language, 32 & 64bit. Fast compiler with many functions that creates fast and small standalone native executables which do not require runtime DLLs. It compiles with FASM or a C compiler, and has inline support.
 PyBASIC
 An interactive BASIC interpreter written in Python.

Q
 QB64
 (Windows, Linux and macOS) — Self-hosting BASIC compiler for Microsoft Windows, Linux and macOS. Aims at full compatibility with Microsoft QBasic and QuickBASIC. BASIC code is translated to C++ and then compiled to executable form.
 QBasic
 (DOS on the PC) — by Microsoft. Subset of QuickBASIC. Came with versions of MS-DOS from 5.0 to 6.22. Also included with DOS 7 (what Windows 95 runs on,) and available from the install CD of Windows 98.
 QuickBASIC
 (DOS on the PC) by Microsoft. An evolution of BASICA/GW-BASIC to block-structured lexical syntax that does not require line numbers, with many added intrinsic functions and language features (e.g. loop and conditional control constructs, file modes, and mixed-language programming support). Has an Integrated Development Environment (IDE), intended to compete with Borland Turbo language products (e.g. Turbo BASIC and especially the contemporarily popular Turbo Pascal). Mostly backward-compatible with BASICA source code. Includes a compiler and linker, and produces MS-DOS executables. Released in versions 1.0, 2.0. 3.0. 4.0, & 4.5. QuickBASIC 4.5 was released in 1988. The QuickBASIC 4.5 IDE includes an interpreter, syntax checking, debugging aids, and online help including a full language reference.
 Quite BASIC
 Web-based classic BASIC programming environment. No download or signup necessary. Introduced in 2006.

R
 RapidQ
 (Windows, Linux, Solaris/SPARC and HP-UX) — Free, borrowed from Visual Basic. Useful for graphical interfaces. Works mainly with QuickBASIC instructions. (Cross-platform, free, no longer being developed). Semi-OO interpreter. Includes RAD IDE.
 RBScript
 (Macintosh, Mac OS X, Linux and Windows) — Scripting language based on REALbasic.
 RC Basic
 (Windows, Linux, Android) — Basic Compiler geared towards game development.
 REALbasic
 (Macintosh, Mac OS X, Linux and Windows) — Platform independent BASIC. Object-oriented Visual Basic-like Basic variant. Currently known as Xojo.
 Revelation BASIC or R/Basic
 (DOS on the PC) — A variant of Pick/Basic used on the Revelation DBMS and successors.
 RFO Basic!
 (Android) — Basic for Android.
RM Basic
 A BASIC provided by Research Machines for their early Nimbus range of PCs
 RobotBASIC
 (Windows) — Free BASIC interpreter and Robotic Simulator for the Windows OS that allows for Gaming and GUI graphical programming. New version will also compile to stand alone executables.
 Rocky Mountain BASIC
 created by HP to control instruments through HP-IB
 Run BASIC
 (Mac OS X, Linux, and Windows) — Free interactive web server-based version of Liberty BASIC

S
 S-BASIC
 "Structured" BASIC, came with Kaypro CP/M systems
 S.A.I.L.B.O.A.T.
 SAIL Basic on Another Tack (CP/M, DOS Z80, X86, pseudo interpreted, Northstar Basic Compatible, B-Tree File System)
 S.I.C.K.
 The Symbolic Instruction Code Kit is a pseudo-BASIC interpreter written in QB64.  
 SAM BASIC
 (SAM Coupé) SAX Basic
 Simple API for XML
 SBAS
 "Structured BASIC" popular in British schools in 1980s & 90s. Written by Bryan Tackaberry of SPA Ltd to run on RM plc computers.
 S-BASIC
 developed for Nokia 9300 and Nokia 9500 Communicator. Development not finished, stopped with version 0.9.
 ScriptBasic
 Cross platform (ANSI C) Open source embeddable interpreter/API. The ScriptBasic project is primarily an embeddable scripting API with examples of a command line interpreter and multi-threaded HTTP application server running as a service.
 sdlBasic
 Free, multiplatform, based on core of wxBasic, but uses the SDL library.
 SEGA BASIC
 SEGA version of BASIC dedicated to SEGA SC-3000 computer
 Sharp BASIC
 (Sharp pocket computers) Simons' BASIC
 A cartridge-based utility that added 114 additional keywords to the standard BASIC 2.0 on the Commodore 64 computer
 Simple BASIC
 for Windows R3 Intermedia Language version Traditional BASIC, made for scientific purpose.
 SIMPOL
 Object-oriented, made to emit code for Windows, Linux, Mac OS X
 Sinclair BASIC
 (ZX80, ZX81/TS1000, ZX Spectrum, Timex Sinclair 2068, Ringo R470, Lambda 8300) SmallBASIC
 (Android, Windows, Linux, DOS, Palm OS, etc.) — A small Open source GPL-ed interpreter.
 Small Basic
 (Windows) — by Microsoft DevLabs Team.
 smart BASIC
 for iOS
 SmartBASIC
 (Coleco Adam) SmileBASIC
 A retro dialect of BASIC used in Petit Computer (for the DSi) and SmileBASIC (for the 3DS)
 Sony BASIC
 for the Sony SMC-70
 SOBS
 (ICT 1900 series) Southampton BASIC System Softworks Basic
 (Win32, Visual Studio.Net, Linux, Unix) — a superset of AlphaBasic
 SpecBAS
 An enhanced Sinclair BASIC interpreter for modern PCs.
 Spectacle BASIC
 (Microsoft Windows — can be recompiled for Mac OS X, Linux and AmigaOS) an open source, interpreted
Spiderbasic
SpiderBasic is a new web client-side programming language based on established BASIC rules. Its allows development of very complex, windowed based web applications, including mobile app for iOS and Android.

 SQABasic
 For the Rational Software designed for Robot Script
 StarBasic
 StarOffice Basic StarOffice Basic
 (a.k.a. StarBasic) (OpenOffice.org, StarOffice) ST BASIC (Atari)
 (Atari ST) — This came with the Atari ST
 STOS BASIC
 (Atari ST) — For Atari ST made for game programming. Predecessor of AMOS BASIC on the Amiga.
 Submarine BASIC
 BASIC-E SuperBASIC
 (Sinclair QL) Super Game System BASIC
 For Windows 10 Is Basic Implementation for learning and creating simple games. 
 SV extended BASIC
 (Spectravideo) — For Spectravideo 318/328, by Microsoft.

T
 T-BASIC
 BASIC dialect used on the Wang 2200T and its Soviet Russian clone, the Iskra (Spark) 226.
 T-BASIC
 Version of Microsoft BASIC used on the Toshiba Pasopia.
 TBASIC
 Version of BASIC used for software development on ATTI's family of BRAT test systems
 Tektronix
 For the 4050 series computers, extensive graphics commands
 Terminal-BASIC
 Pure interpreter, written in C++11. Supports large subset of Minimal BASIC, runs on Arduino, Linux, Windows. Free software (GPL3, LGPL3). Project page.
 THEOS Multi-User Basic
 (THEOS operating system) thinBasic
 interpreter for Microsoft Windows
 TI BASIC
 (note: no hyphen) (TI-99/4A) TI Extended BASIC
 (TI-99/4A) TI-BASIC
 (note: hyphen) (Texas Instruments programmable calculators) Tiger-BASIC
 High speed multitasking, for microcontrollers of the BASIC-Tiger family.
 Tiny BASIC
 (any microcomputer, but mostly implemented on early S-100 bus machines) — Minimalist version which source code was smaller than this article, used on low-memory platforms.
 TML BASIC
 (Apple IIGS) — A compiled BASIC with a GUI hosted IDE for writing native GUI apps.
 TRS-80 Level I BASIC
 (TRS-80) — based on Tiny BASIC.
 TRS-80 Level II BASIC
 (Tandy / RadioShack TRS-80) — based on Microsoft BASIC
 TRS-80 Model 100 BASIC
 (TRS-80 Model 100) — based on Microsoft BASIC, with special support for the RAM file store, LCD display, and other built-in hardware of the TRS-80 Model 100 and Tandy 102 portable computers
 True BASIC
 (DOS, MS Windows, Mac OS, Linux, Unix) — Direct descendant of the original BASIC, Dartmouth BASIC, marketed by its creators. Strictly standards-compliant.
 Turbo Basic
 (Commodore 64) — Added 55 commands to the C64 BASIC, Released by Aztec Software, written by Julian Gardner.
 Turbo Basic
 (DOS on the PC) — Commercial compiler by Borland. (BASIC/Z successor) (see PowerBASIC)
 Turbo-Basic XL
 (Atari 8-bit family) — Freeware interpreter and compiler for the Atari 8-bit family — based on Atari BASIC. Even this "slow" interpreter was about four times faster than the built-in BASIC. Written by Frank Ostrowski, the person who would go on to develop GFA BASIC. Came from Happy Computer.
 TxBasic
 (Linux) Compiler and runtime compatible with Theos MultiUser Basic with extended features
 Tymshare SuperBasic
 (SDS 940)U
 UBASIC
 (DOS on the PC) — Interpreter with many mathematical routines. Strong emphasis on number theory. Can work with many-digit numbers, complex numbers.
 UniBASIC
 dialect that is part of the UniData database, with a strong focus on data access and manipulation.
 UniVerse
 dialect that is part of the UniVerse database, with strong focus on data access and manipulation.
 Uppsala-BASIC
 also known as METRIC-BASIC
 Utah BASIC
 Ellis Computing, had 12-digit precision and matrix operations. MS-DOS port of the Processor Technology 8K BASIC. See Nevada BASIC.

V
 VAX BASIC
 DEC's BASIC-Plus-2 ported to VAX/VMS
 VBA
 See Visual Basic for Applications VBS
 See VBScript VBScript
 (a.k.a. VBS, Visual Basic Script, Visual Basic Scripting Edition) — A subset of Visual Basic used in ASP, Internet Explorer, or under Windows using the Windows Script Host (WSH) as a general-purpose scripting language. VBScript is often used as a replacement for DOS batch files.
 Vilnius BASIC
 (Elektronika BK-0010-01, BK-0011M and UKNC computers) Vintage BASIC
 Cross-platform, open-source interpreter for microcomputer BASIC, written in Haskell. 
 Visual Basic
 (Windows) — Microsoft's object-oriented dialect with rapid application development environment.
 Visual Basic .NET
 (Windows) — Version within the .NET Framework by Microsoft.
 Visual Basic for Applications
 (a.k.a. VBA) (Microsoft Office on MS Windows and Apple Macintosh) Visual Basic Script
 See VBScript Visual Basic Scripting Edition
 See VBScript Visual Test
 (Originally MS-TEST) — Basic in Visual Test
 VSI BASIC for OpenVMS
 Originally released as VAX BASIC by Digital Equipment Corporation, owned by VMS Software Inc. (VSI) since 2014. Runs on the OpenVMS operating system.

W
 Wasabi
 functional dialect with features such as closures, continuations and first order functions, created at Fog Creek Software as an in-house web applications development platform. Not released to public, but often features in the influential blog of Joel Spolsky, Fog Creek founder and CEO.
 Watcom Basic
 Dialect by Watcom
 WinWrap Basic
 VBA type third party interpreter which can be linked into programmes to give them macro/VBA functionality
 WordBasic
 versions of Microsoft Word before MS Word 97
 wxBasic
 open source GPL interpreter based on the platform independent wxWidgets toolkit library. For Linux, Mac OS X (proposed) and Windows.

X
 X11-Basic
 (Atari ST, Windows, Linux, Android, Raspberry Pi) — dialect of the BASIC programming language with graphics, sound and more.
 XBasic
 (Windows, Linux) — Open Source compiler with a GUI designer
 XBLite
 (Windows) — Open Source-compiler with integrated editor
 Xojo
 (MacOS, Linux, Windows, iOS, Raspberry Pi and Web) — Platform independent BASIC. Object-oriented Visual Basic-like Basic variant. Formerly known as REALbasic.

Y
 Yabasic
 (Linux, Windows and PlayStation 2) Small interpreter. (GPL)
 yab
 (BeOS, Zeta, HaikuOS) Adaptation of Yabasic that enables the creation of graphical programs using the BeOS API.
 yBasic
 See HotPaw BasicZ
 ZBasic
 Visual Basic subset dialect for ZX microcontrollers with support for multitasking.
 ZBasic (Zedcor Zbasic)
 first released by Zedcor (Tucson, Arizona) in mid-1985. Versions were made for Apple, DOS, Macintosh CP/M and TRS-80 computers. In 1991, 32 Bit Software Inc. (Dallas, Texas) bought the DOS version and expanded it. Zedcor concentrated on the Apple Mac market and renamed it FutureBASIC. ZBasic was very fast, efficient and advanced, with BCD math precision up to 54 digits.
 Zeus|Basic
 developed for Windows and Pocket PC by KRMicros (Kronos Robotics).

BASIC extensions
BASIC extensions (a.k.a. BASIC toolkits) extend a particular BASIC.(Platforms: APCW = Amstrad PCW; A8 = Atari 8-bit family; C64 = Commodore 64; C128 = Commodore 128; Spec+3 = ZX Spectrum +3; VIC-20) BASIC 8 (C128) — Third-party extension of the C128's Commodore BASIC 7.0
 Beta BASIC (ZX Spectrum) BASIC XL Toolkit (A8) — Disk-based extension of OSS's BASIC XL for Atari 8-bits
 Basic Lightning (C64) — The White Lightning development suite, by Oasis Software included also a quite capable BASIC extension for the Commodore BASIC 2.0
 Exbasic Level II (C64) — Extended BASIC. An improved BASIC for the C64, which was loaded from disk or ROM cartridge.
 Graphics BASIC (C64) — Third-party extension of the C64's Commodore BASIC 2.0
 Laser Basic (C64) — Was Ocean Software's updated version of The White Lightning development suite, which extended Commodore BASIC 2.0. A compiler called Laser Basic Compiler was available.
 Laser Basic (ZX Spectrum) Lightning Extended BASIC (APCW; Spec+3 on CP/M) — Extended Mallard BASIC with sophisticated graphics functions
 YS MegaBasic (ZX Spectrum) Monkey Wrench II (A8) — ROM cartridge extension of Atari BASIC from Eastern House Software. Using the right cartridge slot it required an Atari 800.
 Simons' BASIC (C64) — CBM-marketed improved BASIC for the C64, loaded from disk or ROM cartridge
 Super Expander (VIC-20) — CBM's own cartridge based extension of the VIC-20's Commodore BASIC 2.0
 Super Expander 64 (C64)'' — CBM's own cartridge based extension of the VIC-20's Commodore BASIC 2.0, for the C64

See also
 ALGOL
 COMAL
 Euphoria (programming language)
 FORTRAN
 Open Programming Language

References

External links
 
 Detailed overview of many BASIC compilers
 All BASIC language reference and code project site
 SEGA SC-3000 computer, BASIC language details

BASIC dialects